Washington Township is one of the sixteen townships of Brown County, Ohio, United States. The 2010 census found 2,354 people in the township, over 2,000 of whom lived in the unincorporated portion of the township.

Geography
Located in the northern part of the county, it borders the following townships:
Clay Township, Highland County - north
Whiteoak Township, Highland County - northeast
Eagle Township - east
Jackson Township - southeast corner
Franklin Township - south
Scott Township - southwest
Pike Township - west
Green Township - northwest corner

The village of Sardinia is located in northern Washington Township.

Name and history
It is one of forty-three Washington Townships statewide.

Washington Township was established in 1822.

Government
The township is governed by a three-member board of trustees, who are elected in November of odd-numbered years to a four-year term beginning on the following January 1. Two are elected in the year after the presidential election and one is elected in the year before it. There is also an elected township fiscal officer, who serves a four-year term beginning on April 1 of the year after the election, which is held in November of the year before the presidential election. Vacancies in the fiscal officership or on the board of trustees are filled by the remaining trustees.

References

External links
County website

Townships in Brown County, Ohio
Townships in Ohio
1822 establishments in Ohio
Populated places established in 1822